Solar puffing (also called solar toking or taking solar hits) is the act of using the sun's rays with a magnifying lens or burning glass to heat cannabis for consumption.  

Utilization of this method also provides the practitioner the ability to consume a greater amount of THC within a given amount of cannabis because more THC is preserved for inhalation due to a lower heating temperature as opposed to that of combustion. This method is similar to that of vaporization.

See also
Hookah
One-hitter (smoking)
Operation Pipe Dreams
Thuoc lao
Water pipe percolator

References
 

Drug culture
Cannabis smoking